Babatunde Enitan Wusu (born April 4, 1984 in Lagos, Nigeria) is a football striker from Nigeria who currently plays for KTP.

He also has a Finnish citizenship.

Career 
The top scorer 2008 of Ykkönen moved on 1 January 2008 from Jyväskylän Jalkapalloklubi to Turun Palloseura. Babatunde is very strong and straight forward who is known for his goal scoring ability. He rejoined JJK on a three-year contract on 11 November 2010.

Honours

Club
  Jyväskylän Jalkapalloklubi
 Ykkönen : 2008
 Ykkönen top scorer: 2008 (22 Goals)
 Players' Player in the Ykkönen: 2008
  TPS
 Finnish Cup: 2010

External links
Profile at FCJJK.com
Profile Ykkönen
Profile at Veikkausliiga.com

References

1984 births
Sportspeople from Lagos
Living people
Nigerian footballers
Nigerian expatriate footballers
Expatriate footballers in Finland
Expatriate footballers in Sweden
Expatriate footballers in the United Arab Emirates
Veikkausliiga players
Turun Palloseura footballers
Ljungskile SK players
JJK Jyväskylä players
Nigerian expatriate sportspeople in Finland
UAE First Division League players
Khor Fakkan Sports Club players
Kotkan Työväen Palloilijat players
Association football forwards
Finnish people of Nigerian descent
Naturalized citizens of Finland